Krásný Les is a municipality and village in Liberec District in the Liberec Region of the Czech Republic. It has about 500 inhabitants.

History
The first written mention of Krásný Les is from 1346. The village was probably founded at the beginning of the 14th century.

References

External links

Villages in Liberec District